The  was the 2022 (Reiwa 4) edition of NHK's New Year's Eve TV special Kōhaku Uta Gassen held on December 31, 2022. The previous year, the broadcast was held from the Tokyo International Forum, due to renovations at NHK Hall. The NHK Broadcasting Center was also used. With renovations completed in June 2022, the show returned to be broadcast live from NHK Hall. Ive, Le Sserafim, Twice, and other groups appeared. The WHITE TEAM won this contest.

Events leading up to broadcast
On October 6, NHK announced the broadcast schedule, which started at 19:20 JST, and ended at 23:45 JST on December 31, with a 5-minute break for the latest news. In addition, it will be the first time since 2019 (70th) that the show will be held with an audience at NHK Hall. On October 11, Yo Oizumi and Kanna Hashimoto were announced as the hosts.

Artist lineup
   

Notes

Voting System
This year, the 3-Point System was used again. One point is given from the six judges, another one from audience in TIF, and last one from the viewers. The team with at least 2 points is declared winner of the 73nd edition. This year, the finale song "Hotaru no Hikari" was performed before winning team announcement.

References

NHK Kōhaku Uta Gassen events
2022 in Japanese music
2022 in Japanese television